Luis Felipe Vivanco (22 August 1907 in San Lorenzo de El Escorial – 21 November 1975 in Madrid) was a Spanish architect and poet. He was the son of a judge whose peripatetic career took him to different corners of Spain during his childhood. In 1915 the family settled in Madrid, where Vivanco spent the majority of his life. He studied architecture at university, where he also composed poetry. His friendship with Rafael Alberti and Xavier Zubiri also dates from this period. He finished his architecture course in 1932. His acquaintances also included Luis Rosales and Pablo Neruda.

He spent a long time recovering from illness in the Sierra de Guadarrama. He published his first works in the journal Cruz y Raya run by his uncle José Bergamín. At the same time, he was also working as an architect with another uncle Rafael Bergamín. When the Spanish Civil War broke out, he decided in favour of the Nationalists and wrote propaganda poetry. He wrote in the journal Escorial with Luis Rosales, Leopoldo Panero, etc. They were all considered part of the Generation of '36. In Escorial, he wrote poetry described as intimate, realist and meditative. Also in his work, nature acquires a transcendental quality akin to religious experience. Among his other themes are the family and daily life.

Works
 Cantos de primavera (1936)
 Tiempo de dolor (1940)
 Continuación de la vida (1949)
 Introducción a la poesía española contemporánea (1957)
 El descampado (1957)
 Memoria de la plata (1958)
 Lecciones para el hijo (1966)
 Moratín y la ilustración mágica (1972)
 Prosas propicias (1972)

References

People from San Lorenzo de El Escorial
1907 births
1975 deaths
20th-century Spanish poets
20th-century Spanish architects